Gemini was a Portuguese band from the 1970s. The members were Fatima Padinha, Teresa Miguel, Tozé Brito and Mike Sergeant.

In 1977 they participated in the Portuguese national final in order to represent the country in the Eurovision Song Contest with the song "Portugal no coração". The song won. However, every song was sung by two performers, and the audience preferred Os Amigos over Gemini. Toze Brito and Mike Sergeant had previously been in the grupo Quarteto IIII in the Portuguese National Finals.

They won the national final in 1978 with the song "Dai li dou". However, they only reached the 17th position.

Teresa and Fatima would represent Portugal once more in 1982 in the band Doce.

Discography

LPS
Pensando em Ti (LP, 1977)
Dai Li Dou (LP, 1979)
Os Maiores Êxitos dos Gemini (LP, Polygram)

Singles
Pensando Em Ti / Pequenas Coisas (Single, Polygram, 1976)
Portugal No Coração / Cantiga de Namorar (Single, Polygram, 1977)
Uma Flor À Janela/Vidas Fáceis (Single, Polygram, 1977)
É Natal, Feliz Natal / Natal de Um Homem Só (Single, Polygram, 1977)
O Circo E A Cidade / Ano Novo é Vida Nova (Single, Polygram, 1978)
Dai Li Dou / Gente Lá da Minha Rua (Single, Polygram, 1978)
Dancemos Juntos / O Tempo E O Nada (Single, Polygram, 197*)
Quero Abraçar-te Sexta-Feira à Noite (Single, Polygram, 1979)

Eurovision Song Contest entrants for Portugal
Eurovision Song Contest entrants of 1978
Portuguese pop music groups